Tanaecia cocytus, the lavender count, is a species of nymphalid butterfly found in South and Southeast Asia.

References

 "Tanaecia Butler, [1869]" at Markku Savela's Lepidoptera and Some Other Life Forms

Tanaecia
Butterflies of Asia
Butterflies described in 1787